Warriors (also known as Warrior Cats) is a series of novels based on the adventures and drama of multiple Clans of feral cats. The series is primarily set in fictional forests. Published by HarperCollins, the series is written by authors Kate Cary and Cherith Baldry, as well as others, under the collective pseudonym Erin Hunter. The concept and plot of the pilot series was developed by series editor Victoria Holmes.

There are currently eight sub-series, each containing six books. The first, Warriors: The Prophecies Begin, was published from 2003 to 2004. It details the adventures of a "kittypet" (housecat) named Rusty who joins ThunderClan, one of the warrior cat clans who inhabit the forest. Warriors: The New Prophecy (2005–2006) continues with a focus on the next generation of cats, and chronicles the four Clans' journey to a new home.

The third sub-series, Power of Three (2007–2009), centers around three prophesied cats with extraordinary powers, and the fourth sub-series, Omen of the Stars (2009–2012) details said cats using their powers to defeat evil spirit cats. The fifth sub-series, Dawn of the Clans (2013–2015) details the formation of the Clans. The sixth sub-series, A Vision of Shadows (2016–2018) details the return of a lost Clan as well as a troublesome group of outsiders. The seventh sub-series, The Broken Code (2019–2021), focuses on the cats' connection to their religion, and what happens when they are cut off from it by a vengeful spirit. The eighth sub-series is titled A Starless Clan. The first book, River, was released on 5 April 2022. It centers around the Clans rewriting the rules they live by.

Other books have been released in addition to the main series, including 14 lengthier stand-alone "Super Edition" novels, several e-book novellas later published in seven print compilations, seven guide books, and several volumes of original English-language manga, initially produced as a collaboration between HarperCollins and Tokyopop. The series has also been translated into several languages.

Major themes in the series include adventure, forbidden love, the concept of nature vs. nurture, acceptance, the struggle of good vs. evil, the reactions of different faiths meeting each other, and all people being a mix of good and bad. The authors draw inspiration from several natural locations, and other authors such as J. R. R. Tolkien, J. K. Rowling, and William Shakespeare.

Warriors has received mostly positive reviews, but it has also been criticized for being confusing due to its large number of characters and complex relationships. Critics have compared it to Brian Jaques's Redwall series, although Warriors is written for a lower reading level. Although nominated for several awards, the series has not received any major literary prizes. However, several novels in the series have reached the New York Times Best Seller list, and the series has found popularity in many countries.

Inspiration and origins

The series first began when publisher HarperCollins asked Victoria Holmes to write a fantasy series about feral cats. Holmes was initially not enthusiastic, since she "couldn't imagine coming up with enough ideas". She worked with the concept, however, expanding the storyline with elements of war, politics, revenge, doomed love, and religious conflict. Although the original plan was for a stand-alone novel, enough material was created for several books, and the publisher decided on a six-volume series. The first volume, Into the Wild, was written by Kate Cary under the pseudonym "Erin Hunter" and was completed in about three months. Holmes then began to work behind the scenes, editing and supervising details. Cherith Baldry joined the team to write the third book, Forest of Secrets. Later, after she wrote the first Warriors field guide, Tui Sutherland became the fourth author to use the pseudonym Erin Hunter.

The authors have named several other authors as sources of inspiration when writing the novels. In an online author chat, Cherith Baldry listed the authors that inspire her as including Tolkien, Ursula K. Le Guin, and Shakespeare. In the same chat, Victoria Holmes stated that Jacqueline Wilson, Kathy Reichs, and J. K. Rowling are some of the authors that inspire her. According to the official website, other authors who have inspired the writers include Enid Blyton, Lucy Daniels, Ellis Peters, Tess Gerritsen, Kate Ellis, Lisa Gardiner, and Meg Cabot. The authors have also mentioned several other sources of inspiration. The New Forest in southern England was the base for the forest where the original series took place. Other influential locations include Loch Lomond, as well as the Scottish Highlands. Nicholas Culpeper, a physician who used materials occurring in the natural world as medicine, also had an influence on the Warriors series. His book, Culpeper's Herbal, is used as a source by the authors for the many herbal remedies that the cats use in the books. In addition, the authors suggested that they may use some fan-created character names in future books. The film series Rambo has also been cited as a source of inspiration.

Setting and universe

The Warriors universe centers around a large group of feral cats who initially reside in a forest called White Hart Woods, and later, around a lake known as Sanctuary Lake, after fleeing their forest home due to its destruction by Twolegs (humans). The cats are split into five groups called Clans: ThunderClan lives in woodland areas, WindClan resides on the moors, RiverClan lives by the river, and ShadowClan within and around the swamps. SkyClan, a subsequently introduced fifth group, is revealed to have been a part of this system but was forced to flee when their territory was destroyed by humans for urban development. They rejoined the other Clans during the sixth arc. Each Clan has adapted to their own terrain. For example, RiverClan cats swim in the river to catch fish, while the majority of cats from the other Clans fear and avoid bodies of water. On the other hand, WindClan cats are faster runners, allowing them to catch rabbits and hares on the open moors of their territory. Relationships between different Clans are usually tense and they often come into conflict with one another. However, the Clans also sometimes show concern for each other; the idea of one Clan being destroyed usually causes deep distress and prompts urgent action on behalf of all Clans.

The Clan cats have a faith system based on the concept of StarClan, a group of the spirits of the Clans' deceased ancestors, who provide guidance to the living Clan cats, usually those of the Clan in which they resided in life. After death, the spirits of most Clan cats join StarClan and reside in a paradisaical forest and become one of the stars. StarClan often provides guidance to the Clans through dreams and other signs like omens, most often directed towards each Clan's medicine cats, part of whose role it is to commune with StarClan, in addition to providing medical care to their Clan. In addition to StarClan, there exists the Dark Forest, also known as The Place of No Stars, which takes the form of a never-ending forest. The spirits of cats who caused great pain and suffering to others while alive walk alone there as a form of punishment. Although cats of the Dark Forest are meant to be isolated as punishment, they eventually learn how to appear in the dreams of living cats much the way StarClan does.

Cats who live outside of the Clans are categorized into three groups. Housecats, referred to as "kittypets" by Clan cats, are often looked down upon by the Clan cats for their cozy and lazy lifestyle. "Loners" are feral cats who live outside of the Clans, usually by themselves. They are often regarded by the Clans with suspicion. Similar to loners are "rogues", who differ in that they try to cause the Clan cats harm. In some cases, stray cats may form groups, such as the Sisters (a group of female cats who live together), the Kin (a group of violent rogues), BloodClan (another group of violent rogues) and the Guardians (a group of cats who heal others and avoid conflict). It is rare, though not unheard of, for a kittypet or loner to join a Clan, though outsiders are generally distrusted by Clan cats. In several instances, Clans that have taken in outsiders have been met with scorn by the other Clans.

Beyond the Clans' territories lies a mountain range, inhabited by the Tribe of Rushing Water (often referred to simply as the Tribe), a group of cats who follow a different set of ancestors: the Tribe of Endless Hunting. The Tribe has a different hierarchical structure than the Clans, consisting of a Healer, cave-guards, and prey-hunters, who each serve a different function in the Tribe. The Healer leads the Tribe, heals the ill and wounded, and communicates with the Tribe of Endless Hunting (the Tribe's version of StarClan); the cave-guards defend the Tribe and the prey-hunters hunt for the Tribe. In a subsequent prequel series, it is revealed that the Tribe was formed by the predecessors of the Clans when they left the lake territory to live in the mountains. In turn, cats from the Tribe later moved to the forest of the original series and formed the Clans.

Series plot summaries

Warriors: The Prophecies Begin

The original Warriors series consists of six books: Into the Wild (21 January 2003), Fire and Ice (27 May 2003), Forest of Secrets (14 October 2003), Rising Storm (6 January 2004), A Dangerous Path (1 June 2004), and The Darkest Hour (5 October 2004). The series was subtitled The Prophecies Begin for its re-release with new covers in 2015. The series details the experiences of a housecat named Rusty who ventures into the forest and is invited to join ThunderClan, one of four groups of wild cats in the forest. Throughout the series, he rises through the Clan hierarchy while attempting to uncover and later stop the treachery of his Clanmate and deputy Tigerclaw, who intends initially to usurp ThunderClan's leadership and later plans to take over all the Clans.

Warriors: The New Prophecy

The second series, Warriors: The New Prophecy, consists of six books: Midnight (10 May 2005), Moonrise (1 August 2005), Dawn (27 December 2005), Starlight (4 April 2006), Twilight (22 August 2006), and Sunset (26 December 2006). In this series, the Clans' survival is put at risk as Twolegs begin to destroy their forest home with machinery. The series revolves around a group of cats consisting of Tawnypelt of ShadowClan, Crowpaw (later Crowfeather) of WindClan, Feathertail of RiverClan, and Brambleclaw of ThunderClan, who are joined by Feathertail's brother Stormfur and ThunderClan apprentice Squirrelpaw (later Squirrelflight), brought together by visions from StarClan to embark on a quest to find a new home for the Clans. The series also details the Clans' subsequent journey to find their new lakeside territories, before introducing a new prophecy, "blood will spill blood and the lake will run red", foreshadowing a conflict between Brambleclaw and his half-brother Hawkfrost, the latter of whom plans to follow in their father Tigerstar's footsteps and take over the Clans.

Warriors: Power of Three

The third series, Warriors: Power of Three, consists of six books: The Sight (24 April 2007), Dark River (26 December 2007), Outcast (22 April 2008), Eclipse (2 September 2008), Long Shadows (25 November 2008), and Sunrise (21 April 2009). The plot is centered on the prophecy "There will be three, kin of your kin, who hold the power of the stars in their paws", which was given to Firestar in the standalone novel Firestar's Quest, which takes place between the original Warriors arc and Warriors: The New Prophecy. The prophecy refers to Firestar's grandchildren, who discover over the course of the series that they each have unique supernatural abilities. Jayfeather, who, despite being congenitally blind, can sense others' emotions and enter their dreams (at which time, he is able to see), first learns of the prophecy when he enters Firestar's dream. Believing the prophecy refers to him and his siblings, the series details their efforts to discover his siblings' abilities. They discover that Lionblaze is invulnerable to injury during battle, but, despite their efforts, ultimately conclude that their sister Hollyleaf does not possess any special ability, and thus that the prophecy refers to a yet-undiscovered third cat, a plot point further explored in the subsequent series, Warriors: Omen of the Stars.

Warriors: Omen of the Stars

The fourth series, Warriors: Omen of the Stars, consists of six books: The Fourth Apprentice (24 November 2009), Fading Echoes (23 March 2010), Night Whispers (23 November 2010), Sign of the Moon (5 April 2011), The Forgotten Warrior (22 November 2011), and The Last Hope (3 April 2012). The series continues the plot of Warriors: Power of Three, after it is discovered at the end of the previous series that Lionblaze and Jayfeather's sister, Hollyleaf, does not have a special power, and is thus not the third cat foretold in the prophecy "There will be three, kin of your kin, who hold the power of the stars in their paws". The series begins with Jayfeather and Lionblaze's discovery that the third cat foretold in the prophecy is Dovepaw, one of Firestar's great-grandnieces, when she is discovered to possess the ability of clairvoyance. The trio learn throughout the course of the series that the cats of the Dark Forest, who are spirits of deceased Clan cats who committed acts of evil during their lives, are preparing an attack on the living Clan cats, recruiting living cats to their cause, training them for battle in their dreams, and manipulating the Clans through these cats. Jayfeather receives a vision informing him that there will be a fourth cat integral to the prophecy, who is ultimately revealed during the climactic battle between the Dark Forest and Clans to be Firestar himself, whose defeat of Tigerstar's spirit concludes the battle in the Clans' favor, though Firestar is mortally wounded in the process.

Warriors: Dawn of the Clans
The fifth series, Warriors: Dawn of the Clans, consists of six books: The Sun Trail (5 March 2013), Thunder Rising (5 November 2013), The First Battle (8 April 2014), The Blazing Star (4 November 2014), A Forest Divided (7 April 2015), and Path of Stars (1 September 2015). The arc centers around the formation and early days of the Clans. Cats from the Tribe of Rushing Water in the mountains leave in search of a better home, ultimately discovering the forest which becomes the territories of the modern Clans, and forming the Clans.

Warriors: A Vision of Shadows
Warriors: A Vision of Shadows is the sixth sub-series. The series was originally planned to be titled Warriors: StarClan's Promise. The series comprises six novels: The Apprentice's Quest (15 March 2016), Thunder and Shadow (6 September 2016), Shattered Sky (11 April 2017), Darkest Night (7 November 2017), River of Fire (10 April 2018), and The Raging Storm (6 November 2018). Alderheart, ThunderClan medicine cat, is sent with a patrol to find SkyClan, a lost Clan. The patrol discovers a group of cats under the leadership of a cat named Darktail living in SkyClan's camp, who have driven SkyClan away. On the journey back to the Clans' territories, the patrol finds two abandoned kits under a road. They name them Twigkit and Violetkit and bring them back to be adopted by ThunderClan and ShadowClan respectively. However, Darktail's group of cats follows the patrol and attacks the Clans. A group of ShadowClan cats rebel against their leader, Rowanstar, and join Darktail's invasion, driving out Rowanstar. Darktail and his followers then attempt to destroy the remaining three Clans. Darktail is ultimately revealed to be the rejected son of WindClan leader Onestar. Twigkit (now Twigbranch) leaves ThunderClan in search of SkyClan and brings them to the lake. ShadowClan disbands and joins SkyClan, with Rowanstar giving up his leadership. However, his son Tigerheart rebuilds the Clan and becomes their new leader, taking the name Tigerstar. Tensions between the Clans rise when Tigerstar's deputy, Juniperclaw, attempts to poison SkyClan. Juniperclaw later sacrifices himself to save Tigerstar's son, Shadowkit, and Violetkit (now Violetshine) from drowning. SkyClan is accepted by the other Clans.

Warriors: The Broken Code
Warriors: The Broken Code is the seventh sub-series, consisting of Lost Stars (9 April 2019), The Silent Thaw (29 October 2019), Veil of Shadows (7 April 2020), Darkness Within (10 November 2020), The Place of No Stars (6 April 2021), and A Light in the Mist (9 November 2021). During an unexplained period of silence from StarClan, Bramblestar, leader of ThunderClan, falls ill, and ShadowClan medicine cat Shadowsight receives a vision telling him to let Bramblestar lose a life in order for him to heal. After losing said life, a warrior of ThunderClan named Bristlefrost notices that Bramblestar has begun behaving erratically. Over the course of the series, it is revealed that Bramblestar's body has been possessed by a spirit cat, referred to as the impostor. Shadowsight visits the Dark Forest and discovers Bramblestar's spirit has been trapped. Eventually, a battle ends with the impostor's capture. Squirrelflight realizes the identity of the spirit who has taken over Bramblestar's body: Ashfur, a cat who loved her to the point of obsession. It is also revealed that he has blocked the connection between the living Clans and StarClan. Ashfur then takes Squirrelflight with him to the Dark Forest, where it is revealed that he has taken control of all the spirits of cats who have died since he possessed Bramblestar. Bristlefrost, Shadowsight, and a SkyClan warrior named Rootspring all enter the Dark Forest, where they help Bramblestar's spirit take his body back. After returning to the living Clans, more warriors are again sent to the Dark Forest to defeat Ashfur. A battle ensues, and it ends in the deaths of Bristlefrost and Ashfur. The living cats who ventured into the Dark Forest reunite with StarClan, where they question the warrior code. Ultimately, the Clans are given three moons to rewrite the warrior code so that it may serve the Clans better.

Warriors: A Starless Clan 
Warriors: A Starless Clan is the eighth sub-series, consisting of River (5 April 2022), Sky (1 November 2022), Shadow (4 April 2023), and three unnamed installments. It revolves around the Clans trying to rewrite the code they live by, and the issues that arise from such a daunting task. The series is written from the viewpoints of Nightheart, a ThunderClan warrior, Sunbeam, a ShadowClan warrior, and Frostpaw, a RiverClan medicine cat apprentice.

Standalones

Super Editions

Super Editions are stand-alone books in the Warriors series that are about 500 pages long, approximately double the length of a regular Warriors book. The first Super Edition was Firestar's Quest, detailing Firestar's journey to rebuild SkyClan, the long-lost fifth Clan of the forest. Other super editions include Bramblestar's Storm, describing newly appointed ThunderClan leader Bramblestar learning to lead his Clan through hardship, Yellowfang's Secret, which tells the story of a ShadowClan medicine cat whose son eventually murders his own father and nearly destroys his entire Clan with his vicious conquests, and Bluestar's Prophecy, which tells the story of Bluestar, ThunderClan's leader before Firestar. There have been 15 Super Editions published thus far, with the most recent, Onestar's Confession, having been released in September 2022. Each Super Edition (excluding Firestar’s Quest) contains an exclusive manga chapter at the end. The Super Editions include:

 Firestar's Quest (21 August 2007)
 Bluestar's Prophecy (28 July 2009)
 SkyClan's Destiny (8 August 2010)
 Crookedstar's Promise (5 July 2011)
 Yellowfang's Secret (9 December 2012)
 Tallstar's Revenge (2 July 2013)
 Bramblestar's Storm (26 August 2014)
 Moth Flight's Vision (3 November 2015)
 Hawkwing's Journey (1 November 2016)
 Tigerheart's Shadow (5 September 2017)
 Crowfeather's Trial (4 September 2018)
 Squirrelflight's Hope (3 September 2019)
 Graystripe's Vow (1 September 2020)
 Leopardstar's Honor (7 September 2021)
 Onestar's Confession (6 September 2022)
 Riverstar's Home (5 September 2023)

Field guides
The authors have also produced multiple "field guides", which include short stories, lists, and art that further detail various aspects of the series' universe. Each installment is usually about 150 pages long. The field guides include:
Secrets of the Clans (29 May 2007): A guide that details a variety of topics, most notably the founding of the Clans as well as detailing some of their mythology.
Cats of the Clans (24 June 2008): A character guide which includes both a synopsis and official art for the major characters of The Prophecies Begin and The New Prophecy sub-series.
Code of the Clans (9 June 2009): A breakdown of the warrior code, a code of honor followed by all Clan cats, and its tenets, including several short stories explaining the origins of certain elements of the code.
Battles of the Clans (1 June 2010): A guide that details the fighting techniques and battle tactics of the various Clans.
Enter the Clans (26 June 2012): A bind-up of Secrets of the Clans and Code of the Clans.
The Warriors Guide (8 August 2012): A Barnes and Noble-exclusive guide.
Warriors: The Ultimate Guide (5 November 2013): A character guide including both a synopsis and official art for the major characters for all arcs up to and including the fifth arc, Dawn of the Clans. It is an updated and expanded edition of Cats of the Clans.
The Ultimate Guide: Updated and Expanded (10 October 2023): An updated version of The Ultimate Guide with more characters and recent information.

Original English-language manga
Several series of original English-language manga were produced by HarperCollins with Tokyopop. With the shutdown of Tokyopop, subsequent manga volumes have been published under the HarperCollins name alone. The manga series consists of several sub-series, Graystripe's Adventure, Tigerstar and Sasha, Ravenpaw's Path, and SkyClan and the Stranger, each with three books, as well as the stand-alone book, The Rise of Scourge, all by Dan Jolley. Starting with A Shadow in RiverClan, these books were instead marketed as graphic novels and are standalone volumes instead of being parts of trilogies. The mangas include:

 Graystripe's Adventure
 The Lost Warrior (24 April 2007)
 Warrior's Refuge (26 December 2007)
 Warrior's Return (22 April 2008)
 The Rise of Scourge (24 June 2008)
 Tigerstar and Sasha
 Into the Woods (2 September 2008)
 Escape from the Forest (23 December 2008)
 Return to the Clans (9 June 2009)
 Ravenpaw's Path
 Shattered Peace (24 November 2009)
 A Clan in Need (23 March 2010)
 The Heart of a Warrior (3 August 2010)
 SkyClan and the Stranger
 The Rescue (5 July 2011)
 Beyond the Code (22 November 2011)
 After the Flood (3 April 2012)
 A Shadow in RiverClan (2 June 2020)
 Winds of Change (1 June 2021)
 Exile From ShadowClan (7 June 2022)
 A Thief in ThunderClan (6 June 2023)

Novellas
Several novellas have also been written by Erin Hunter and were originally published only in e-book format. They were subsequently published in anthology volumes of three novellas each, starting with Legends of the Clans. The novellas include:

 The Untold Stories (2 July 2013)
 Hollyleaf's Story (3 March 2012)
 Mistystar's Omen (11 September 2012)
 Cloudstar's Journey (29 January 2013)
 Tales from the Clans (4 November 2014)
 Tigerclaw's Fury (28 January 2014)
 Leafpool's Wish (22 April 2014)
 Dovewing's Silence (4 November 2014)
 Shadows of the Clans (26 January 2016)
 Mapleshade's Vengeance (24 March 2015)
 Goosefeather's Curse (1 September 2015)
 Ravenpaw's Farewell (26 January 2016)
 Legends of the Clans (11 April 2017)
 Spottedleaf's Heart
 Pinestar's Choice
 Thunderstar's Echo
 Path of a Warrior (9 April 2019)
 Redtail's Debt
 Tawnypelt's Clan
 Shadowstar's Life
 A Warrior's Spirit (7 April 2020)
 Pebbleshine's Kits
 Tree's Roots
 Mothwing's Secret
 A Warrior's Choice (6 April 2021)
 Daisy's Kin
 Spotfur's Rebellion
 Blackfoot's Reckoning

Critical reception
The first book of the series, Into the Wild, was generally well-received, with reviewers calling it a "spine-tingling", "thoroughly engrossing", and "exciting... action-packed adventure". One reviewer praised the authors for "creating an intriguing world... and an engaging young hero". However, another criticized the characters and imagined world as being "neither... consistent nor compelling".

The manga has also earned praise: a reviewer for Children's Bookwatch noted that Into the Woods "ends on a tense cliffhanger, leaving the reader in anxious anticipation for more... Into the Woods... is especially recommended for cat lovers everywhere". Its sequel, Escape from the Forest, was also well reviewed: a reviewer for Publishers Weekly believed that girls would benefit from reading about Sasha leaving the powerful Tigerstar due to his "growing violence". The art was also praised, with the reviewer writing that "Hudson's artwork brings Sasha's emotional journey to life, showing each moment of fear, anxiety, contentment, and joy. The cat's-eye perspective of many of the panels, in addition, add a dramatic, energizing element to the book". The reviewer also wrote that "a twist at the end will leave fans eager for the next installment of Sasha's saga", and that the book would appeal to young adults trying to find their place in the world. Lisa Goldstein for School Library Journal also gave the book a positive review, writing that the plot would attract new fans and appeal to old fans. The reviewer also wrote that "though the cover claims that this is a 'manga', the straightforward illustrations are drawn in a simple, realistic style".

The large number of characters involved in the series has often been seen as a negative point; though one reviewer compared the "huge cast" to that of a Greek drama, others wrote that it was "hard to follow" and "a little confusing". The characters have also been criticized as being "somewhat flat" and "limited essentially to each individual's function within the clan".

As one reviewer put it, the cats in the series are "true to their feline nature", leading some critics to jokingly comment that the books will "leave readers eyeing Puss a bit nervously", and wondering "what dreams of grandeur may haunt the family cat". However, this realism also means that the series contains a relatively large amount of violence, with one critic stating that it is "not for the faint of heart". Several critics have compared Warriors to Brian Jacques' Redwall series, though one commented that it was "not as elegantly written". The New York Times called the series a "hit with young readers", specifically because of its "sprawling universe", and the series appeared on the New York Times Best Seller list for a total of 117 weeks, as of 24 November 2013.

Awards and recognitions
Into the Wild was nominated for the Pacific Northwest Library Association's 2006 Young Reader's Choice Awards but lost to Christopher Paolini's Eragon. It was also listed on Booklists Top 10 fantasy books for youth in 2003 and was a Book Sense 76 Pick. The Sight was nominated for the best Middle Readers book in Amazon's Best Books of the Year (2007) and placed sixth out of the ten nominees, with six percent of the total votes. It was also nominated for the Children's Choice Book Awards. In 2006, Warriors also received an honourable mention for the best book series for Publishers Weekly's "On the Cuff" awards.

Themes
Holmes has said that one of the good things about writing a book about cats is that "we can tackle difficult human issues such as death, racial intolerance, and religious intolerance [without seeming so heavy]".

The series often revolves around forbidden love. These relationships are not allowed for various reasons: some involve medicine cats, who are not allowed to have mates according to the medicine cat code, while others develop between cats in different Clans, which is also forbidden by the warrior code (for example, Graystripe of ThunderClan and Silverstream of RiverClan). Holmes said that another central theme of the series is "faith and spirituality" regarding StarClan. All books in the series feature the influence of StarClan, not just as the cats think of them, but in terms of prophecies delivered by StarClan which inevitably come true. Some scenes take place within StarClan's realm, with no living cats present. Thus, the existence of an afterlife and the influence of spirits who have passed on and yet retain their earthly identities is integral to all of the plot arcs in the series. Another idea explored in the novels is the reactions of different faiths when meeting each other. For example, the Tribe of Rushing Water, which believes in different spiritual ancestors than the Clans, is introduced in Moonrise. In an author chat, Holmes explained that the books never say that either the Clans or the Tribe of Rushing Water is right about faith because both are "equally valid". This leads to fear and suspicion between them because they are afraid of things they do not understand. Holmes remarked that "ignorance is a very scary thing!" Non-belief is also explored in the storylines through characters, like Cloudtail and Mothwing, who do not believe in StarClan.

Another theme is that characters can be a mix of good and evil. Holmes has said she is fascinated by these "shades of gray" in personalities. Her example of this was when Bluestar, a noble and honorable cat, gave up her kits for her own ambitions. Another example she gave of this is how antagonist Tigerstar, even with all of his faults, is still courageous and fiercely loyal. Similarly, Holmes has also connected the theme to Brambleclaw and how nobody knew whether he was good or evil. A third major theme, often referred to as nature versus nurture, explores whether a character is born the way he or she will be, or if other extrinsic factors shape that. For example, Brambleclaw's father is the evil Tigerstar, but Brambleclaw eventually demonstrates that he is not evil himself, despite initial suspicion from Clanmates due to his father's legacy. This ties into the "shades of gray" theme.

A reviewer for Publishers Weekly noted that friendship and responsibility are taught to characters in the novels, while another reviewer pointed out the idea that, just as Clan cats shun house cats for their soft life, people should realize that it is necessary to experience hardship in life. A Storysnoops reviewer noted that one of the themes was that "it doesn't matter where you come from, only who you are inside". In Dawn, the importance of cooperation is explored. The four Clans, normally hostile to each other, are forced to work together in order to find a new home. Other themes that have been pointed out deal with family, loss, honor, bravery, death, loyalty, and following rules.

Publication history
All of the Warriors books except for the manga (excluding all mangas published from A Shadow in RiverClan onwards) have been published as hardcovers, and the majority of them have also been published as paperbacks, audiobooks, and e-books. The New Prophecy audiobooks are spoken by Nanette Savard, whose performance has been praised by reviewers. A reviewer for AudioFile wrote: "Nanette Savard brings out the youth of the cats who are struggling to help their clan survive and to protect each other from outside danger". The Omen of the Stars audiobooks are spoken by voice actress Veronica Taylor.

Foreign editions

The Warriors series was first published in the United States and United Kingdom. The editions published of the first two series—Warriors and Warriors: The New Prophecy—in the United Kingdom had slight variations in cover design from their United States counterparts. Warriors is also sold in New Zealand, Australia, and Canada. Translations into other languages such as Czech, Norwegian, Lithuanian, Finnish, Japanese, French, Spanish, Russian, Chinese, and Korean have also been published. The first six books have been published in Italy and Latin America, and the first five series in Germany and the Netherlands. Fans also exist in Trinidad and Singapore. The first two books have been published in Poland.

Other media

Website
The Warriors website previously featured Warriors screensavers, videos on topics such as the process of writing a manga book, and quizzes. In addition, there were browser-based games including the New Prophecy Adventure and the Warriors Adventure Game. An additional game for the website was planned for release in 2010, but was never released despite a report of having completed first-round testing. It has been stated that there is no plan for an official video game, but if one were to be made, it would likely be based on a movie adaptation of the Warriors series. Many fans have resorted to making their own games and websites, many of these sites being play-by-post role-playing game forums. The website was later re-designed and is now accessible via both browser and an official mobile application. Much of the old content was not carried over to the new version of the website, though a new character creation game and an updated version of the family tree have been added.

Film
On 20 October 2016, Victoria Holmes announced that Alibaba Pictures had bought the production rights for a film adaptation with David Heyman as producer, and a movie poster was released. On 14 May 2018, it was announced that STX Entertainment had come on board to co-produce the Warriors film, with STX board member Gigi Pritzker working alongside Heyman. It was also announced that screenwriters Jonathan Aibel and Glenn Berger would write the screenplay for the movie. No director or release date has yet been announced for the film, and no information has been released since.

Short stories
The first short story written by Erin Hunter is "Spottedleaf's Honest Answer", in which the spirit of former ThunderClan medicine cat Spottedleaf discusses her love for Firestar. In the process, the story provides readers with information on events that occurred in the Warriors series from Into the Wild to Firestar's Quest.

On 20 January 2009, another short story, "The Clans Decide," was released on the Warriors Ultimate Leader Election site, starring Firestar, who won an election through an online fan vote conducted in recognition of US President Obama's Inauguration Day. In the story, cats from the four Clans vote on whether or not the Clans should work together to survive a tough winter; the cats ultimately vote in favor of working together.

Two short stories, "After Sunset: The Right Choice?" and "The Elders' Concern", were previously available through the defunct Warriors mobile application. "The Elders' Concern" has been noted to contain timeline errors. Taking place after Bluestar's selection of Fireheart for deputy, the story details the elder Halftail waking the other elders to discuss his discontent with the decision with them. In "After Sunset: The Right Choice?", Brambleclaw, after killing his half-brother Hawkfrost to save Firestar (as depicted in Sunset), worries about Firestar's reaction, but Firestar turns out to be proud of him. Additionally, in 2009, an educator's guide was released.

Plays
Written by Victoria Holmes for a tour, a play titled After Sunset: We Need to Talk was first premiered on 28 April 2007 at the Secret Garden bookstore in Seattle, Washington. It details a meeting between Leafpool of ThunderClan and Crowfeather of WindClan after the events of Sunset. The script was released to the public on the old official site for the Warriors series.

During a fundraising event in Russellville, Arkansas, Brightspirit's Mercy was performed by various high school drama students. The second of two plays by Erin Hunter, Brightspirit's Mercy is about Jaypaw, Lionblaze, and Hollyleaf. In the play, the characters go to a Gathering where it is obvious all of the Clans except for ThunderClan are starving. Three cats from StarClan appear to them: Brightspirit and her parents, Shiningheart and Braveheart, characters created on Wands and Worlds, a fantasy fiction forum, in memory of a 10-year-old Warriors fan, Emmy Grace Cherry, and her parents, Dana and Jimmy Cherry, all three of whom were killed in a tornado in February 2007. They tell the three young cats that they must help feed the other Clans. Jaypaw is easily convinced, but Hollyleaf and Lionblaze are harder to win over. Eventually, they agree and hunt, then wait at the WindClan border for a patrol. Ashfoot, WindClan's deputy, accepts the gift, but Breezepaw, too proud to have help from another Clan, refuses to eat it. Jaypaw, Lionblaze, and Hollyleaf then head towards another Clan's territory.

Physical media

In the Chinese translation of the series, "3-D trading cards" are packaged in each book. The 3-D effect is produced using stereoscopic lenticular printing. These cards feature pictures of the cats on the center of the book cover and their Chinese and English names, and biographical information on the back. In 2019, when the official Warriors Hub app was released, several pieces of official, licensed merchandise were released as well. This included Clan-themed posters, pins, bracelets, bookmarks, stationery, figurines, necklaces, bags, and shirts. Small plush heads and full-sized plush toys of various characters have also been produced, as well as small figurines.

Mobile application
On 30 June 2011, an official iOS application and Android application was released on the iTunes App Store and Google Play Store. It contained information about the books in the series, profiles of the Clans and major characters (including app-exclusive information), an interactive timeline and maps, two application-exclusive short stories, a trivia game, and a list of all the Warriors books that had been released at that point. The app was eventually removed from the App Store. In 2019, an updated Warriors app was released, called Warrior Cats Hub. Through this app, one can access blogs and analysis written by the editors of the series, shop for merchandise, browse fanart, and vote in polls, some of which affect the plot of the Warriors series.

References

External links

 
Book series introduced in 2003
Fantasy novel series
Novels about cats
HarperCollins books